Samantha Ponder (née Steele; born December 11, 1985) is an American sportscaster who is the host of Sunday NFL Countdown on ESPN. Prior to hosting Sunday NFL Countdown, Ponder worked as a reporter/host for ESPN college football and as a basketball sideline reporter. Ponder replaced Erin Andrews on College GameDay Saturdays at 10 AM ET on ESPN, as well as co-host of the Saturday 9 AM ET edition on ESPNU. In addition to her duties on College Gameday, Ponder had been the regular sideline reporter for ESPN's Thursday Night College Football with Rece Davis, Jesse Palmer, and David Pollack from August 2012 until 2014. Ponder also appeared on the ESPN-owned Texas-oriented regional network Longhorn Network.

Biography
Born in Phoenix, Arizona, Ponder attended Central High School in Phoenix. Ponder first attended The King's College in New York City after high school. While in New York City, she applied for a hostess job at ESPN Zone where she met Ben Keeperman, a college football researcher and manager with ABC Sports Radio and that led to an internship at the network which in turn led to a researcher-assistant job with ABC-TV on the college football studio show. She transferred to Liberty University after Liberty's Sr. Sports Producer Bruce Carey offered her a job as sideline reporter for the Liberty Flames sports television network. After graduating in 2009, she worked for Fox Sports Net and Fox College Sports as a sideline reporter for Pac-10 and Big 12 college basketball and football games. On July 7, 2011, ESPN's Longhorn Network announced that it had hired Ponder as a sideline reporter. Ponder, along with Kevin Dunn and Lowell Galindo, were the newly created network's first three talent hires. After accepting her position with the Longhorn Network, Ponder relocated to Austin, Texas.

Personal life
Ponder is a Christian. After a brief courtship, she married then-Minnesota Vikings quarterback Christian Ponder on December 17, 2012, in Hudson, Wisconsin. She started appearing on ESPN/ABC broadcasts by her married name, starting with the January 1, 2013 broadcast of the CapitalOne Bowl.  In July 2014, the couple had their first daughter, Bowden Sainte-Claire "Scout". They also have a son, Robinson True, born in June 2017, and a daughter, Price Anne-Drew, born in July 2018.

References

External links

Samantha Ponder on Twitter
ESPN biography of Ponder
BattleBots

Living people
Liberty University alumni
American television sports announcers
ESPN people
American sports announcers
American sports journalists
Christians from Arizona
Journalists from Arizona
College football announcers
College basketball announcers in the United States
Television personalities from Phoenix, Arizona
Women sports announcers
1985 births